Tefenni District is a district of the Burdur Province of Turkey. Its seat is the town of Tefenni. Its area is 582 km2, and its population is 10,744 (2021).

Composition
There is one municipality in Tefenni District:
 Tefenni

There are 13 villages in Tefenni District:

 Başpınar 
 Bayramlar 
 Belkaya 
 Beyköy
 Çaylı 
 Hasanpaşa
 Karamusa 
 Sazak 
 Seydiler 
 Yaylaköy 
 Yeşilköy 
 Yuva 
 Yuvalak

References

Districts of Burdur Province